Gary Hughes (February 2, 1941 – September 19, 2020) was an American baseball executive. He also served as a coach and scout.

Career
Hughes went to Junípero Serra High School in San Mateo, California; one of his classmates was Jim Fregosi.  He graduated from San Jose State University. He served as the baseball coach at Marin Catholic High School from 1964 through 1972. He then became a part-time scout, working in Northern California for the San Francisco Giants, Seattle Mariners, and New York Mets, before he was hired on a full-time basis by the New York Yankees. Hughes became the scouting director for the Montreal Expos, and the assistant general manager and scouting director for the Florida Marlins, starting at the organization's inception in 1991. After working briefly for the Colorado Rockies and Cincinnati Reds, Hughes worked for the Chicago Cubs from 2002 through 2011 as the special assistant to the general manager. The Red Sox hired Hughes in 2012 as a scout.

Honors
Baseball America presented Hughes with its lifetime achievement award in 2007. He was inducted into the Marin Catholic Hall of Fame in 2007 and Professional Baseball Scouts Hall of Fame in 2009.

Personal
Hughes had five children, four step-children, seventeen grandchildren and two great-grandchildren.  Hughes' son Michael "Rock" Hughes is the visiting clubhouse manager for the Miami Marlins and is the longest termed full time employee of the Marlins, being with the team since it was founded.  Rock is married to the sister of Milwaukee Brewers manager Craig Counsell.
Hughes’ son Sam is a National Crosschecker with the New York Yankees.

References

1941 births
2020 deaths
San Jose State University alumni
Major League Baseball scouts
Major League Baseball scouting directors
San Francisco Giants scouts
New York Mets scouts
Seattle Mariners scouts
New York Yankees scouts
Montreal Expos scouts
Miami Marlins scouts
Colorado Rockies scouts
Cincinnati Reds scouts
Chicago Cubs executives
Boston Red Sox scouts
Place of birth missing
Junípero Serra High School (San Mateo, California) alumni
https://www.12up.com/posts/yankees-steal-son-of-legendary-cubs-scout-for-national-crosschecking-position-01drae3ycccs